The 2009–10 KB První Liga competition was a Czech domestic rugby club competition operated by the Česká Rugbyová Unie (ČSRU). It began on September 13, 2009 with a match between Přelouč and Slovan Bratislava at the Rugbyové hřiště PARKHEM in Přelouč, and continued through to the final round of matches on June 6, 2010 (there was no final).

Havířov and Přelouč were relegated from the KB Extraliga at the end of the 2008 season, while Bystrc and Zlín were promoted to the same.

Havířov were declared winners and promoted to the KB Extraliga for the next season, after finishing in top spot on the log. Second-placed Olomouc were also promoted, having won the promotion playoffs against Bystrc.

Competition format
Each club played every other club twice, with matches being played over fourteen rounds.

The teams

Table

Schedule and results
From the official ČSRU site. Within each weekend, matches are to be listed in the following order:
 By date.
 If matches are held on the same day, by kickoff time.
 Otherwise, in alphabetic order of home club.

Rounds 1 to 5
Round 1
 13 September, 14:00 — Havířov 36 - 39 Praga B
 13 September, 14:00 — Sokol Mariánské Hory 30 - 0 Slavia Prague B
 13 September, 14:00 — Přelouč 65 - 13 Slovan Bratislava
 13 September, 16:00 — Olomouc 56 - 0 ARC Iuridica

Round 2
 19 September, 13:30 — Praga B 12 - 34 Olomouc
 20 September, 14:00 — Přelouč 11 - 23 Havířov
 20 September, 14:00 — Slovan Bratislava 16 - 31 Slavia Prague B
 1 November, 13:00 — ARC Iuridica 14 - 21 Sokol Mariánské Hory

Round 3
 26 September, 14:00 — Havířov 76 - 15 Slovan Bratislava
 27 September, 14:00 — Olomouc 24 - 28 Přelouč
 27 September, 14:30 — Sokol Mariánské Hory 34 - 32 Praga B
 28 September, 17:00 — Slavia Prague B 58 - 19 ARC Iuridica

Round 4
 3 October, 14:00 — Havířov 21 - 0 Olomouc
 3 October, 14:00 — Slovan Bratislava 32 - 26 ARC Iuridica
 4 October, 17:00 — Praga B 26 - 7 Slavia Prague B
 31 October, 14:00 — Přelouč 27 - 20 Sokol Mariánské Hory

Round 5
 10 October, 11:00 — Sokol Mariánské Hory 7 - 24 Havířov
 11 October, 15:00 — ARC Iuridica 15 - 28 Praga B
 11 October, 16:00 — Olomouc 81 - 7 Slovan Bratislava
 11 October, 16:00 — Slavia Prague B 17 - 35 Přelouč

Rounds 6 to 10
Round 6
 18 October, 14:00 — Havířov 97 - 0 Slavia Prague B
 18 October, 14:00 — Olomouc 39 - 3 Sokol Mariánské Hory
 18 October, 14:00 — Slovan Bratislava 3 - 7 Praga B
 18 October, 15:30 — Přelouč 82 - 3 ARC Iuridica

Round 7
 25 October, 12:00 — Slavia Prague B 10 - 61 Olomouc
 25 October, 15:30 — Praga B 21 - 0 Přelouč
 25 October, — ARC Iuridica 0 - 48 Havířov
 25 October, — Sokol Mariánské Hory 54 - 12 Slovan Bratislava

Round 8
 3 April, 10:30 — Praga B 12 - 31 Havířov
 4 April, — ARC Iuridica - Olomouc
 4 April, — Slavia Prague B - Sokol Mariánské Hory
 4 April, 14:00 — Slovan Bratislava 13 - 27 Přelouč

Round 9
 11 April, 13:00 — Havířov 54 - 20 Přelouč
 11 April, 13:30 — Olomouc 41 - 36 Praga B
 11 April, 14:00 — Sokol Mariánské Hory 46 - 3 ARC Iuridica	
 11 April, 15:00 — Slavia Prague B 36 - 15 Slovan Bratislava

Round 10
 18 April, 13:00 — Slovan Bratislava 12 - 55 Havířov
 18 April, 14:00 — Přelouč 14 - 17 Olomouc
 18 April, 14:30 — Praga B 7 - 56 Sokol Mariánské Hory
 18 April, 16:00 — ARC Iuridica 17 - 17 Slavia Prague B

Rounds 11 to 14
Round 11
 2 May, — ARC Iuridica 27 - 13 Slovan Bratislava
 2 May, — Olomouc 20 - 13 Havířov
 2 May, — Slavia Prague B 17 - 38 Praga B
 2 May, — Sokol Mariánské Hory 12 - 6 Přelouč

Round 12
 9 May, — Havířov 35 - 7 Sokol Mariánské Hory
 9 May, 16:00 — Praga B 26 - 23 ARC Iuridica
 9 May, — Přelouč 93 - 14 Slavia Prague B
 9 May, — Slovan Bratislava 20 - 68 Olomouc

Round 13
 30 May, 14:00 — Sokol Mariánské Hory 0 - 43 Olomouc
 30 May, 14:00 — Slavia Prague B 19 - 67 Havířov
 30 May, 15:00 — Praga B 76 - 17 Slovan Bratislava
 30 May, 15:30 — ARC Iuridica 3 - 38 Přelouč

Round 14
 6 June, 14:00 — Havířov 30 - 0 ARC Iuridica
 6 June, 14:00 — Olomouc 76 - 0 Slavia Prague B
 6 June, 14:00 — Slovan Bratislava 17 - 59 Sokol Mariánské Hory
 6 June, 17:00 — Přelouč 19 - 46 Praga B

References

External links
 1. liga KB 2009-2010

2009–10 in Czech rugby union
2009–10